Kelly Willard (born on August 18, 1956) is a contemporary Christian musician best known for her praise and worship recordings. She was featured as a soloist on projects from Integrity, Vineyard Music, and Maranatha! Music. In addition she sang duets and background vocals with such artists as Dion DiMucci, Lenny LeBlanc, Amy Grant, Ricky Skaggs, Paul Overstreet, Twila Paris, Steve Green, Fernando Ortega, Keith Green, Buddy Greene, Jim Cole and many others. Kelly has also recorded nine solo projects, currently offered through her website.

Willard was born in Winter Haven, Florida. She began playing the piano at the age of five and composing her own songs at the age of thirteen. She accompanied the church choir, playing and singing in nursing homes, and traveling with a part-time gospel group on weekends. At the age of sixteen Willard moved to Nashville, Tennessee, where she accompanied The Jake Hess Sound on piano. She later moved to Panorama City, California, where she joined the popular CCM group The Archers, and then on to Oklahoma City, Oklahoma, where she joined the group Seth. She credits her vocal development to Jonathan David Brown and Harlan Rogers.

Willard married at 18, joined Harlan Rogers & Friends, and traveled the mid-west until 1977, when she moved to Southern California to be a part of the then current flow of 'Jesus Music' artists who were ministering and recording there. She played keyboards and sang background vocals on projects for artists including Bob Bennett and Roby Duke before Maranatha! Music approached her in 1978 to record her own solo project.

After the birth of her children, she took periodic sabbaticals, homeschooling through the 1980s, 1990s, and later taking care of her mother, who was suffering with Alzheimer's. In 2004, both her parents died, her 29-year marriage came to an end, and her 18-year-old daughter Haylie committed suicide after a struggle with severe depression. Willard later referred to the period in an interview as "the worst year of my life." Willard moved to Jacksonville, Florida, and became part of a church support community there.

Her latest album, recorded in 2000, titled Paga, features then 18-year-old son Bryan on bass guitar, and 15-year-old Haylie in a duet on the song "Beautiful Jesus". Kelly explains, "The Old Testament priests who would take incense into The Holy of Holies and burn it unto The Lord. This is called Paga in Hebrew, and it means "to make intercession". When Jesus became our sacrifice ... He made the way for our prayers, praises, worship and intercession to become like that incense unto the Lord, a sweet-smelling savor ... Even with all that I have been through, nothing has changed my relationship with The Lord or the call that He placed on my life at a young age. If anything, I have gained more wisdom through the things (even mistakes) that I have suffered, and am more dependent on Him than ever before. I can testify of God's ultimate faithfulness to His children, and His unwavering commitment to conform us into the likeness of His dear Son, Jesus Christ. And, I plan to keep on singing about it until the very end."

Willard is currently living in Florence, Alabama, and is writing and recording a new "duo" project with long-time friend, Rene Stamps.

Discography
1978 Blame It on the One I Love
1980 Willing Heart
1983 Psalms, Hymns, and Spiritual Songs
1986 Message from a King
1991 Lookin' Back '77-'86
1991 Garden
1993 Bless My Little Girl
1996 My First Christmas
1996 Homesick for Heaven
2007 Paga
2012 Message from a King

References

External links
 

1956 births
Living people
American performers of Christian music
Performers of contemporary Christian music
People from Winter Haven, Florida
Musicians from Nashville, Tennessee
Musicians from Jacksonville, Florida